Broken Symmetries is a novel by Paul Preuss published in 1983.

Plot summary
Broken Symmetries is a novel in which the powerful US/Japanese TERAC accelerator in Hawaii is surrounded by scientific and political infighting.

Reception
Dave Langford reviewed Broken Symmetries for White Dwarf #62, and stated that "Broken Symmetries has its flaws – like a spy-novel cliché or two – but it's an impressive and unnerving performance.  In the tradition of Greg Benford's Timescape."

Reviews
Review by Debbie Notkin (1983) in Locus, #273 October 1983
Review by Tom Easton (1984) in Analog Science Fiction/Science Fact, February 1984
Review by Norman Spinrad (1984) in Isaac Asimov's Science Fiction Magazine, December 1984

References

1983 novels